is a national university in Japan. The main campus of the university is in Otaru, Hokkaido, with a satellite campus in Chūō-ku, Sapporo.

Overview 
The university is often called "Taru-shō" or "Shō-dai". The graduate university has a MBA program, the "Major in Entrepreneurship" course.

The symbol of the university was designated on October 1, 1998. The logo imprints the year of the establishment, the name of the university (OUC), and the symbol of two wings of Hermes, who is the Olympian god of commerce.

Faculties

Faculty of Commerce 
 Department of Economics
 Department of Commerce
 Department of Law
 Department of Information and Management Science
 Teachers' Training Program in Commerce

Graduate School of Commerce 
 Major in Modern Commerce (Master and Doctor Program)
 Major in Entrepreneurship (Professional Degree (MBA) Program)

History 

The university was established in 1910 as the Otaru Higher Commercial School, becoming the fifth national school of commerce in Japan. In 1944, during World War II, the school was renamed Otaru College of Economics. In 1949, the Otaru University of Commerce was officially established, with a Faculty of Commerce. The university became a junior college and a Graduate School of Commerce.

In 1991, the system of the university was reorganized, establishing four departments in the Faculty of Commerce: the Department of Economics, Department of Commerce, Department of Law, and Department of Information and Management Science.

The Otaru University of Commerce's Junior College was abolished in 1996. After the establishment of a satellite campus in Chuo-ku, Sapporo, the university opened a major in Business Administration in the graduate school in 1997. In 2005, the satellite campus was moved its current location in Kita-ku, Sapporo.

Evaluation from Business World

References

External links 
 Otaru University of Commerce Main Page 

Japanese national universities
Universities and colleges in Hokkaido
Hokkaido American Football Association
Buildings and structures in Otaru